Adamowice  is a village in the administrative district of Gmina Lyski, within Rybnik County, Silesian Voivodeship, in southern Poland.

Gallery

References

External links

Adamowice